The Spirit of Aggieland is the alma mater of the Texas A&M University. It was originally written as a poem by Marvin H. Mimms while he was a student at Texas A&M. Richard J. Dunn, the director of the Fightin' Texas Aggie Band at the time, composed the music. Students, faculty, and former students of the A&M sing the song at Aggie sporting events, Muster, and other events.

The song was used as a wakeup call on Day 10 of space mission STS-124 for Texas A&M former student and mission specialist Mike Fossum.

Lyrics (Original)

A yell sequence follows; traditionally omitted at Muster.

Lyrical change
The official lyrics for the last two lines of the chorus are "For we are the Aggies - the Aggies so true; We're from Texas A.M.U." These changes were made following the school's name change in 1963 from the Agricultural and Mechanical College of Texas (Texas A.M.C.) to Texas A&M University.  The revised lyrics are used by choral groups on campus except for the Singing Cadets, which sings the original lyrics. However, students usually sing the original lyrics out of respect for the history of Texas A&M.

Additional meaning
The Spirit of Aggieland also refers to the "spirit can ne'er be told." Many people describe Texas A&M University as having a unique school spirit that "From the outside looking in, you can't understand it. And from the inside looking out, you can't explain it." It has perhaps best been stated by a former Vice Student Body President of the University of Texas at Austin Eric Opiela when discussing the loss of life in the 1999 Texas A&M Bonfire collapse:

See also

 Traditions of Texas A&M University

References

Texas A&M University traditions
American college songs
Alma mater songs
Songs about Texas